Marosszék was one of the seats in the historical Székely Land. It was named after the Maros, a river with the biggest discharge in the seat. The composer Zoltán Kodály wrote the Dances of Marosszék (1927, for piano, later orchestrated) based on the folk music of this region.

Population
The religious make-up of Marosszék in 1867 was the following:

Calvinist: 48,034
Roman Catholic: 15,697
Greek Catholic: 12,641
Unitarian: 7,116
Greek Orthodox: 5,520
Jewish: 944
Lutheran: 285
Foreigner: 771
Total: 91,008

Gallery

References
 Orbán, Balázs (1868). A Székelyföld leírása. Pest: Panda és Frohna Könyvnyomdája.

States and territories established in the 12th century
States and territories disestablished in 1876
1876 disestablishments in Hungary